Governor West may refer to:

Caleb Walton West (1844–1909), Governor of Utah Territory from 1886 to 1888 and 1893 to 1896
Francis West (1586–1634), Deputy Governor of the Colony and Dominion of Virginia from 1627 to 1629
John C. West (1922–2004), 109th Governor of South Carolina
John West (governor) (1590–1659), colonial Governor of Virginia from 1635 to 1637
John West, 1st Earl De La Warr (1693–1766), Governor of Gravesend and Tilbury from 1747 to 1752 and of Guernsey from 1752 to 1766
Joseph West (politician) (fl. 1669–1684), English-born governor of South Carolina
Martin West (colonial administrator) (1804–1849), Governor of Natal from 1845 to 1849
Oswald West (1873–1960), 14th Governor of Oregon